KHIZ may refer to:

 KHIZ-LD, a low-power television station (channel 2, virtual 39) licensed to serve Los Angeles, California, United States
 KILM, a television station (channel 24, virtual 64) licensed to serve Inglewood, California, which used the call sign KHIZ from 1992–2012